Kunz v. New York, 340 U.S. 290 (1951), was a United States Supreme Court case finding a requirement mandating a permit to speak on religious issues in public was unconstitutional. It was argued October 17, 1950, and decided January 15, 1951, 8–1. Chief Justice Vinson delivered the opinion for the Court. Justice Black and Justice Frankfurter concurred in the result only. Justice Jackson dissented. 

Kunz helped establish that government restrictions on speech must be narrowly tailored so that they do not inappropriately limit expression protected by the First Amendment. In Kunz, the Court held that laws giving public officials broad discretion to restrain speech about religious issues in advance are an invalid prior restraint in violation of the First Amendment. The Court reversed the 1948 conviction of Baptist minister Carl J. Kunz for violating a New York City ordinance that prohibited religious services on public streets without a permit from the police commissioner. Although the ordinance specified no grounds for refusing permission to speak, Kunz was denied permits in 1947 and 1948 after he was accused of “scurrilous attacks” on Catholics and Jews under a previous permit. Kunz was arrested for speaking without a permit in Columbus Circle.

Kunz's conviction for violating the ordinance was upheld by the Appellate Part of the Court of Special Sessions and by the New York Court of Appeals. The Supreme Court said that New York's ordinance was too broad because it provided no standards that an administrator could use to determine who ought to receive permits to speak about religious issues. 

In dissent, Justice Robert Jackson said Kunz had used “fighting words” that were not protected by the First Amendment (see unprotected speech). He also criticized the Court for striking down the permit scheme when it had, in Feiner v. New York (1951), allowed local officials the discretion to arrest volatile speakers during their presentations.

See also
Clear and present danger
Imminent lawless action
List of United States Supreme Court cases, volume 340
Shouting fire in a crowded theater
Threatening the president of the United States
Abrams v. United States, 
Brandenburg v. Ohio, 
Chaplinsky v. New Hampshire, 
Feiner v. New York, 
Hess v. Indiana, 
Korematsu v. United States, 
Masses Publishing Co. v. Patten, (1917)
Sacher v. United States,  
Schenck v. United States, 
Terminiello v. Chicago, 
Whitney v. California,

External links
 
 

United States Supreme Court cases
United States Supreme Court cases of the Vinson Court
United States Free Speech Clause case law
1951 in United States case law
United States equal protection case law
Baptist Christianity in New York (state)
Columbus Circle
Antisemitism in New York (state)
Anti-Catholicism in the United States